The Fireproof Building, also known as the County Records Building, is located at 100 Meeting Street, at the northwest corner of Washington Square, in Charleston, South Carolina. Completed in 1827, it was the most fire-resistant building in America at the time, and is believed to be the oldest fire-resistant building in America today.

After an extensive renovation, the building reopened in 2018 as the South Carolina Historical Society Museum.

Description and history
The Fireproof Building is a two-story masonry structure, set on a tall stone basement with an arcade of round-arch openings and built out brick that has been stuccoed to resemble stone.  The building is in the Greek Revival style, with Doric porticoes north and south, and achieves a sophisticated appearance with clean and crisp lines, and relatively little ornamentation. Inside, the building has an oval stair hall lit by a cupola. The stone stairs are cantilevered through three stories.

The building was built to house the office and records of Charleston County. The contractor, John G. Spidle, built it in 1827 to the design of Robert Mills, the nation's first domestically-trained architect and an early advocate of fire-resistant buildings.  The Fireproof Building was listed on the National Register of Historic Places in 1969, and declared a National Historic Landmark in 1973.

The building is currently the home of the South Carolina Historical Society. In 2016-17 the society completed a major renovation intended to modernize all systems, to provide a secure, climate controlled environment for the storage of historic documents, and to provide both an events venue and modern museum space.  In the summer of 2018 the society reopened the building as a museum dedicated to the history of South Carolina and to the history of the Fireproof Building itself.

See also
 List of National Historic Landmarks in South Carolina
 National Register of Historic Places listings in Charleston, South Carolina
 Fireproofing
 Passive fire protection

References

External links

Fireproof Building, Charleston County (100 Meeting St., Charleston), including 7 photos, at South Carolina Department of Archives and History

Historic Charleston's Religious and Community Buildings, a National Park Service Discover Our Shared Heritage Travel Itinerary
Robert P. Stockton, Information for Guides of Historic Charleston, South Carolina 350 (1985).
South Carolina Historical Society
U.S. National Park Service

Buildings and structures in Charleston, South Carolina
County government buildings in South Carolina
National Historic Landmarks in South Carolina
Historic American Buildings Survey in South Carolina
Government buildings completed in 1827
Robert Mills buildings
National Register of Historic Places in Charleston, South Carolina
Passive fire protection
Historic district contributing properties in South Carolina
Government buildings on the National Register of Historic Places in South Carolina
1827 establishments in South Carolina